Texas Terror may refer to:

Texas Terror (film), a 1935 western film starring John Wayne
Texas Terror, a franchise in the Arena Football League in the late 1990s, later Houston Thunderbears